Heartless may refer to:

Books
Heartless (Carriger novel), a 2011 novel in the New York Times best-selling "Parasol Protectorate" series by Gail Carriger
Heartless (Pretty Little Liars), a 2010 novel in the "Pretty Little Liars" series by Sara Shepherd

Film
Heartless (1995 film), a 1994 short film directed by Emanuele Crialese
Heartless (1997 film), a 1997 television film starring Mädchen Amick
Heartless (2005 film) (also known as Lethal Seduction), a 2005 film directed by Robert Markowitz
Heartless (2009 film), a 2009 British horror film directed by Philip Ridley
Heartless (2014 film), a 2014 Bollywood romantic thriller film directed by Shekhar Suman

Music
Heartless (Moneybagg Yo mixtape), 2017
Heartless (Pallbearer album), 2017
"Heartless" (Diplo song), 2019
"Heartless" (Heart song), 1976
"Heartless" (Kanye West song), 2008, covered by The Fray and other artists
"Heartless" (Polo G song), 2019
"Heartless" (The Weeknd song), 2019
"The Heartless", a 1997 song by HIM from the album Greatest Lovesongs Vol. 666
"Heartless", a 1999 song by God Forbid from the album Reject the Sickness
"Heartless", a 2004 song by Converge from the album You Fail Me
"Heartless", a 2005 song by A Day to Remember from the album And Their Name Was Treason
"Heartless", a 2010 song by Carnifex from the album Hell Chose Me
"Heartless", a 2010 song by Justin Nozuka from the album You I Wind Land and Sea
"HeartLess", a 2018 song by Madison Beer from the EP As She Pleases

Television
Heartless (TV series), a 2014–15 Danish TV fantasy series
"Heartless" (Once Upon a Time), an episode of the sixth season of Once Upon a Time

Other
Heartless (Kingdom Hearts), a form of monster in the Kingdom Hearts video game series
Heartless (online game), an online card game developed by Free Fall Associates

See also 
 Heart (disambiguation)
 Akuji the Heartless, a 1998 action-adventure video game
 Heartless Bastards, a garage rock band
 Heartless Bitches International, a humorous women's website
 Heartless Crew, UK garage group of disc jockeys